To Die For is a 1994 British romantic comedy-drama film directed by Peter Mackenzie Litten and written by Johnny Byrne, Paul McEvoy and Litten. The film stars Thomas Arklie, Ian Williams, Tony Slattery, Dillie Keane, Jean Boht, John Altman and Caroline Munro.

Plot
Set in London in the early 1990s, the film portrays the bittersweet lifestyles of a young gay couple in a fiery open relationship. Mark is an acerbic drag queen with a sharp tongue, who finds it difficult to accept his much better-looking partner's highly promiscuous lifestyle of non-stop clubbing and cruising. Worse still, Mark is HIV positive and his partner is negative.

Both of them are struggling to come to terms with Mark's deteriorating condition. Nowadays, Mark prefers to stay at home when not performing – working on his own panel of embroidery for an AIDS quilt memorial project. Simon, however, prefers to turn a blind eye to the situation and continues to cruise London's gay bars at night looking for action.

Mark dies early on in the story and Simon becomes the focus of the story as he buries his feelings and continues his torrid sex life. At first, he seems completely unaffected by his lover's death. However, when Mark returns to haunt him, his life suddenly becomes a lot more complex, especially as he is the only one who can see Mark.

It turns out that Mark has actually returned to help his partner to accept his true feelings and to encourage him to reassess his reckless lifestyle – a lifestyle that he is sure will never bring him the happiness he seeks. Eventually, Mark gets through to him and Simon breaks down and weeps for the very first time.

Mark's work is done and he can leave his one-time lover to move on with his life.

Cast
 Thomas Arklie as Simon
 Ian Williams as Mark
 Tony Slattery as Terry
 Dillie Keane as Siobbah
 John Altman as Dogger
 Jean Boht as Mrs. Downs
 Caroline Munro as Mrs. Pignon
 Ian McKellen as Quilt Documentary Narrator

External links
 
 
 

1994 films
1994 fantasy films
1994 independent films
1994 LGBT-related films
1994 romantic comedy films
1994 romantic drama films
1990s ghost films
1990s fantasy comedy-drama films
1990s romantic comedy-drama films
1990s romantic fantasy films
British fantasy comedy-drama films
British ghost films
British independent films
British LGBT-related films
British romantic comedy-drama films
British romantic fantasy films
1990s English-language films
Films about the afterlife
Films set in London
Films shot in London
Gay-related films
HIV/AIDS in British films
LGBT-related romantic comedy-drama films
1990s British films